Seven ships of the British Royal Navy have been named HMS Kangaroo, after the kangaroo.

 , a 16-gun fir-built brig-sloop built at Rotherhithe in 1795 and sold in 1802.
 , an 18-gun Merlin-class sloop launched in 1805 and sold in 1815.
 , a survey brig purchased in 1818 in the West Indies. Re-rigged as a ship in 1823 and wrecked off Cuba in 1828.
 , a 3-gun schooner, ex-Las Damas Argentinas, purchased in 1829 and sold in 1834.
 , a 12-gun  ordered as HMS Dove in 1839, renamed Kangaroo in 1843 and eventually launched in 1852. She was sold in 1897.
 , a B-class torpedo boat destroyer launched in 1900 and sold in 1920.

See  also
 HM Colonial brig Kangaroo (1812), an armed brig based in Australia from 1814 to 1817, and sold in 1818
 , a ship of the Royal Australian Navy

References
 
 

Royal Navy ship names